The North Adelaide District Football Association (NADFA) was an Australian rules football competition based in the northern and north-eastern suburbs of Adelaide, South Australia until it merged with the East Torrens Football Association to form the Norwood-North Football Association at the end of the 1968 season.  It was formed in 1921 under the patronage of the North Adelaide Football Club with complete control over its own affairs.

The association came into controversy in 1927 when a player, J. Warming, was not permitted to play for league club West Adelaide due to a 12-month suspension received for striking an umpire whilst playing within the North Adelaide District Association.

Member Clubs

Premierships

References 

1921 establishments in Australia
1968 disestablishments in Australia
Defunct Australian rules football competitions in South Australia